Ilija Čolak-Antić, (4 July 1836 – 12 October 1894) was a Serbian Army officer of the late nineteenth century. Čolak-Antić commanded a Serbian army during the Serbian–Turkish Wars, the conflict leading to the nation's independence from the Ottoman Empire. Following the war he served as military attaché to the newly independent kingdom.

Čolak-Antić was the elder son of a renowned Serbian family, he attended the Military Academy then studied artillery in Belgium as an officer cadet. Under the supervision of the minister of war, he was involved in the reform of artillery in anticipation of a conflict with the Ottoman Empire. Shortly before the outbreak of the Herzegovina uprising, he commanded a battalion group before serving as intelligence officer in the Sanjak of Novi Pazar. During the war that followed, he succeeded wounded General Zach as commander of the Ibar army. Following the treaty of Berlin, he held a series of diplomatic missions in France and Italy before being appointed military attaché to the Austro-Hungarian empire.

Family background 
Ilija K. Čolak-Antić was born on 4 July 1836, in Čačak, Principality of Serbia, into a prominent Serbian noble military family that originated from Old Herzegovina and Old Serbia. Čolak-Antić was the third son of Konstantin Čolak-Antić, son of Vojvoda Čolak-Anta Simeonović, a famed military commander and duke of Revolutionary Serbia.

Čolak-Antić's mother Jovanka, was a daughter of Jovan "Demir" Mitrović, Obor-kapetan in the Habsburg-Austrian army, and related to Prince Maksim Rasković, leader of the Old Vlach during the First Serbian uprising. After following Karađorđe into exile in Bessarabia, the family lived in Saint Petersburg where his father was admitted to the First Cadet Corps at Saint Petersburg, by special decree of Emperor Alexander I. The family returned to Serbia in 1830 and his father was appointed district judge in Čačak, they lived in Kruševac, then the Serbian capital. Čolak-Antić had three brothers Lazar, Ljubomir, and Vlajko as well as a sister Christina. When he was twelve both his parents died, Čolak-Antić and his siblings were then raised by a relative. He finished elementary school in Užice before attending secondary school in Kragujevac.

Early career 
After graduating from secondary school in 1851, Čolak-Antić entered the Military Academy at the age of fifteen. Upon completion of his studies in 1857 he was sent to Liege, Belgium to follow postgraduate training as an Officer cadet, while his brother Lazar was sent to study at the Prussian Artillery School alongside Sava Grujić and Dimitrije Đurić. Together with Stanojlo Stokić, Čolak-Antić translated the Prussian officers' booklet  (The Science of Combat) which became one of the combat manuals of the Serbian Military Academy. Čolak-Antić extended his stay in Belgium upon government request to 1858 in order to study weapon manufacturing, at the time the Principality did not produce weapons, and relied on buying the surplus of the Austrian and Russian armies. On his return, he taught at the Artillery School in Belgrade before joining the Ministry of Defense.

In the period from 1859 to 1872, in anticipation of a conflict with the Ottoman Empire, Čolak-Antić was in charge of reforming the artillery and modernising the Serbian army's weapons under the supervision of the Minister of War Milivoje Blaznavac. Serbia was feverishly searching for a country that would supply it with modern weapons equipped with the new percussion system. After the minister hastily purchased defective M1867 rifles, Čolak-Antić organised their conversion at the arsenal of Kragujevac. In 1865, Čolak-Antić was sent to Vienna by Prince Mihailo Obrenović with the secret mission of acquiring weapons for the Principality of Montenegro. Having successfully completed this task, Prince Nikola Petrović-Njegoš decorated him with the Order of Prince Danilo I. After a year spent at the War Office, the headquarters of the Armed forces of the Principality of Serbia, he was made commander of a battalion group (Čačak, Rudnik and Užice). In 1875 during the Herzegovina uprising he was sent to the Sanjak of Novi Pazar as intelligence officer to collect information and advise the insurgents.

Serbian–Ottoman Wars 

At the outbreak of the Serbian-Ottoman War in June 1876, Čolak-Antić was appointed commander of the Čačak brigade, his brother Lazar's unit was attached to the main army of Mikhail Chernyayev in command of the Kruševac brigade, while their other brother Ljubomir Čolak-Antić ran the arsenal in Kragujevac. On 8 July Čolak-Antić leading the Ušica Division managed to repulse the Ottomans, crossing the border at Raška pushing them  back towards Novi Pazar. On the proposal of the Minister of Defense, on 7 July 1876, the government decided to issue a law on "awards for meritorious service in war" with Čolak-Antić one of the first recipient. Prince Milan Obrenović (future Serbian king) awarded him the Order of the Cross of Takovo for bravery.

Replacing the wounded general František Zach, Čolak-Antić was promoted to commander of the Ibar army as he was considered to be Zach's best lieutenant and was very popular with the troops. Leading a corps of twelve thousand soldiers and six thousand volunteers, he launched a new offensive on 24 July towards Sjenica, repulsing a Turkish column under Dervish Pasha back towards the town. For about two weeks his forces besieged the town using heavy artillery against its fortifications.

On 28 September, leading the left wing of General Đura Horvatović, Čolak-Antić launched an attack on the Turkish right rear defended by Adyl Pasha. Distinguishing himself in the subsequent battles he was promoted to the rank of colonel. His brother Major Lazar Čolak-Antić was promoted to lieutenant colonel also receiving the medal for bravery for his defense of the Jankova gorge, northwest of Čučale, after he lead a corps of Serb volunteers against a much larger Turkish force.

Postwar career 
After the end of the war and the subsequent autonomy of the country, Čolak-Antić was sent on several missions abroad for the Serbian government, first in Paris where he negotiated contracts for the purchase of military equipment for the newly formed Serbian Kingdom, then to Vienna on 25 November 1879, as head of the artillery administration. In Austria, he was sent to visit arsenals together with the foundry controller Zivadin Dimitrijević before heading to Italy where he studied the fabrication of gunpowder in Naples, Capua, Scafati, Turin and Genoa. The foundry controller Zivadin Dimitrijevic set off together with him to Vienna again in order to study the Vienna Arsenal. They returned to Belgrade on 29 February 1880, and reported to the Minister of War.

In 1884–1885 he became military attaché in Vienna. On several occasions, he was chairman of the military commission on weapons-related matters. On behalf of King Aleksandar Obrenović, on 1 January 1891, the royal deputies decorated retired Colonel Čolak-Antić with the Order of the Takovo Cross of the Second Order. He died on 12 October 1894, in Belgrade at the age of 58.

Personal life 
Čolak-Antić married Jelena (née Matić), daughter of prominent Liberal politician and philosopher Dimitrije Matić who was President of the National Assembly in 1878 when Serbia gained independence from the Ottoman Empire. They had three children, Boško Čolak-Antić (1871–1949) Marshal of the Court and diplomat, Vojin Čolak-Antić (1877–1945), General in the Royal Serbian Army and Jovanka who died as a volunteer nurse at the beginning of the First World War. After the death of his brother Lazar in October 1877 in Kruševac, he looked after his daughter Milica, she later married Vladislav Ribnikar, the founder of Politika.

See also
 Čolak-Antić family

Notes

References 
 

 

Čolak-Antić family
1836 births
1894 deaths
Military personnel from Čačak
People from the Principality of Serbia
People from the Kingdom of Serbia
Serbian soldiers
Royal Serbian Army soldiers